John Gary Evans (October 15, 1863June 26, 1942) was the 85th governor of South Carolina from 1894 to 1897.

Early life
Evans was born in Cokesbury, South Carolina to an aristocratic and well-connected family. His father was Nathan George Evans, a Confederate general, and after his father died in 1868, he went to live in Edgefield with his uncle Martin Witherspoon Gary. After completing his secondary education in Cokesbury, he enrolled at Union College in Schenectady, New York. His uncle's death in 1881 forced him to withdraw from college due to financial constraints, but he would later graduate in 1883.

Political career
Admitted to the bar in 1887, Evans began the practice of law in Aiken and became known for his representation of poor farmers which led to the development of ties with John Lawrence Manning and Benjamin Tillman. He was elected in 1888 to the South Carolina House of Representatives at the age of 25 and elevated four years later in 1892 to the South Carolina Senate. His rapid political rise continued by being elected in 1894 as the 85th governor of South Carolina at the age of 31, youngest ever for a South Carolina governor. During his time as governor, Evans continued the policies of Tillman and presided over the constitution convention of 1895.

Pledging not to run for reelection as governor in 1896, Evans set his sights instead for the U.S. Senate race. He lost the election and his attempt for an open Senate seat in 1897 again proved equally unsuccessful. Frustrated, Evans volunteered as a major in the U.S. Army for the Spanish–American War in 1898 and helped create the civilian government of Havana. After the war, he resumed the practice of law in Spartanburg.

Later life and career
Further attempts at an open Senate seat in 1902 and 1908 proved futile and henceforward he focused his energies on internal Democratic politics. Three times he served as a delegate to the Democratic National Conventions in 1900, 1912 and 1916. In 1914, he became the chairman of the South Carolina Democratic State Executive Committee and from 1918 to 1928 was the National Democratic Committeeman from South Carolina. Evans won a term to the South Carolina House of Representatives in 1922 from Spartanburg and served on the judiciary and rules committees.

On June 26, 1942, Evans died, and was buried at Willowbrook Cemetery in Edgefield. His Spartanburg home was listed on the National Register of Historic Places in 2007.

References

External links
 SCIway Biography of John Gary Evans
 USC Biography of John Gary Evans
 Marion County Biography of John Gary Evans

1863 births
1942 deaths
Democratic Party governors of South Carolina
University of South Carolina trustees
Union College (New York) alumni
People from Cokesbury, South Carolina
People from Aiken, South Carolina
People born in the Confederate States